Kaligagan Island (also called Qisĝagan or Qisxagan) is an island located in the Krenitzin Islands of  Alaska.

History
The name of the island was transcribed in 1852 by the Imperial Russian Navy vice admiral Mikhail Tebenkov.

References 

Alaska Maritime National Wildlife Refuge
Islands of Alaska
Islands of Aleutians East Borough, Alaska
Krenitzin Islands
Uninhabited islands of Alaska